Marlene Kairouz (born 2 March 1975) is a former Australian politician. She was a Labor member of the Victorian Legislative Assembly between 2008 and 2022, representing the electoral district of Kororoit. She was the Minister for Consumer Affairs, Gaming and Liquor Regulation between 2016 and 2020.

Political career
Kairouz was first elected to the Legislative Assembly at the 2008 Kororoit by-election, triggered by the resignation of former minister Andre Haermeyer.

Prior to entering state politics she had been elected to the City of Darebin in 1998, serving as mayor from 2001 to 2002 and again from 2006 to 2007. Kairouz was an official with the Victorian branch of the Shop Assistants' Union from 2004, and was promoted to become an organiser in 2005 before her election to Parliament. Kairouz has been a state and national Australian Labor Party conference delegate, and previously served as the Junior Vice-President of the Victorian ALP. 

In 2001, Kairouz was awarded the Centenary Medal for services to local government.

In June 2016, she was appointed to the First Andrews Ministry as Minister for Consumer Affairs, Gaming and Liquor Regulation. In September 2017, she was appointed as the Minister for Local Government. In November 2018, she retained her consumer affairs, gaming and liquor regulation portfolio in the Second Andrews Ministry, and was also appointed Minister for Suburban Development.

Racism controversy
In October 2017, Kairouz was embroiled in a controversy regarding her advice not to open doors to Irish people, following claims that a spate of thefts were being caused by travelling con artists with Irish accents.  She issued an apology on Twitter. The incident received widespread media coverage in Australia and Ireland.

Branch-stacking allegations 
In June 2020, an adviser working for Kairouz was alleged to have facilitated branch-stacking. The adviser is alleged to have obtained money from Adem Somyurek in order to purchase party memberships. Kairouz has rejected claims she was involved, and the matter has been referred to IBAC and Victoria Police. She resigned from the cabinet on 16 June 2020.

She was a person of interest in the IBAC investigation, Operation Watts.

References

External links
 Parliament of Victoria biography

1975 births
21st-century Australian politicians
21st-century Australian women politicians
Australian Labor Party members of the Parliament of Victoria
Australian people of Lebanese descent
Labor Right politicians
Living people
Mayors of places in Victoria (Australia)
Members of the Victorian Legislative Assembly
Recipients of the Centenary Medal
RMIT University alumni
Women members of the Victorian Legislative Assembly
Women mayors of places in Victoria (Australia)